Erika "Riki" Lindhome (born March 5, 1979) is an American actress, comedian, and musician. She is also known as a singer and songwriter for the comedy folk duo Garfunkel and Oates.

After making her television debut in 2002 with minor roles in the television series Titus and Buffy the Vampire Slayer, she guest starred on the WB series Gilmore Girls (2005–2006), the CBS sitcom The Big Bang Theory (2008; 2017), and the HBO series Enlightened (2011). She co-created and starred in the Comedy Central period sitcom Another Period (2015–2018) with Natasha Leggero. She voiced the recurring role of Kimberly Harris in the Fox animated sitcom series Duncanville (2020–2022) and, as of 2022, stars as Dr. Valerie Kinbott in the Netflix comedy horror series Wednesday.

Lindhome made her feature film debut in the 2004 film Million Dollar Baby as Mardell Fitzgerald, and went on to star in the comedy horror films Hell Baby (2013) and The Wolf of Snow Hollow (2020). She also had supporting roles in the films Pulse (2006), The Last House on the Left (2009), Much Ado About Nothing (2012), Fun Size (2012), The Lego Batman Movie (2017), and Knives Out (2019).

In 2007, she formed Garfunkel and Oates with actress Kate Micucci. The duo starred in, produced, and wrote an eponymous television series on IFC, which aired for one season in 2014. Their 2016 Vimeo comedy special, Garfunkel and Oates: Trying to Be Special, was nominated for a Primetime Emmy Award for Outstanding Original Music and Lyrics.

Early life
Erika Lindhome was born on March 5, 1979, in Coudersport, Pennsylvania, and raised in Portville, New York. She is primarily of Swedish ancestry. Lindhome graduated from Portville High School in 1997. She majored in communications and film at Syracuse University, where she graduated in 2000.

In 1997, Lindhome won first prize in the JFK Profiles in Courage essay contest awarded by the John F. Kennedy Library in Boston. Lindhome's subject was United States Representative Carolyn McCarthy (D-NY), whose outrage at the murder of her husband and five others by a gunman on a Long Island train compelled her to challenge and win the seat held by her congressman, who had voted to repeal the Federal Assault Weapons Ban.

Career

Acting

Without an agent, Lindhome started her acting career with minor roles on the sitcom Titus and in one season seven episode of the TV series Buffy the Vampire Slayer in 2002. In 2003, Lindhome joined The Actors' Gang and appeared in the play Embedded. She was one of four actors from the play to be cast in the 2004 film Million Dollar Baby, in which she played Mardell Fitzgerald, who is the sister of Maggie, the film's lead.

Lindhome briefly appeared as a nameless student in a season three episode of the television series Gilmore Girls in 2002 before later guest starring as Juliet on the show's fifth and sixth seasons. She also appeared in the 2006 techno-horror film Pulse and in the 2008 crime drama film Changeling. She guest starred on the television series The Big Bang Theory as Ramona Nowitzki, a graduate student who is obsessed with Sheldon Cooper, in seasons two and ten. She guest starred in the television series Pushing Daisies as Jeanine, and in 2008 had a minor role as murder victim Vanessa Holden on Criminal Minds. In 2009, she starred in The Last House on the Left, a remake of the 1972 horror film of the same name, as Sadie.

In 2011, Lindhome was featured alongside Heather Morris, Sofía Vergara, and Ashley Lendzion in "Nuthin' But a Glee Thang", a Glee-themed Funny or Die parody of the Dr. Dre song "Nuthin' but a 'G' Thang". From 2010 to 2013, Lindhome hosted the Nerdist podcast Making It with Riki Lindhome, in which Lindhome interviewed people in the entertainment industry about their rise to fame. From 2011 to 2013, she guest starred as Harper on the HBO television series Enlightened. Lindhome played a female version of Conrade, one of Don John's followers, in Joss Whedon's Much Ado About Nothing, a 2012 adaptation of William Shakespeare's play of the same name, and appeared in the 2012 comedy film Fun Size. In 2013, Lindhome starred in the horror-comedy film Hell Baby as Marjorie, the protagonist's Wiccan sister, a role for which she did a full frontal nude scene that attracted attention because of its unusual length.

In 2015, Lindhome and Natasha Leggero created the Comedy Central series Another Period, which they also starred in together. The show, which focuses on the Bellacourts, a fictional aristocratic family living in Newport, Rhode Island at the turn of the 20th century, premiered in June 2015. She appeared in a recurring role on the television series The Muppets in 2015 as Becky, Fozzie Bear's human girlfriend. Also in 2015, she appeared in a season two episode of Fresh Off the Boat, and in Brooklyn Nine-Nines season three episode "The Swedes". Lindhome voiced Poison Ivy in the 2017 animated film The Lego Batman Movie.

In 2018, Lindhome guest starred as Shaina, a recovering drug addict, in an episode of the comedy-drama television series Kidding. In October 2019, she was featured in SoulPancake's short documentary film Laughing Matters. The following month, she appeared as part of the ensemble cast of the 2019 mystery film Knives Out, in which she played Donna Thrombey. Lindhome began starring in the Fox animated sitcom series Duncanville in February 2020, voicing the character Kimberly Harris, the emotional 12-year-old sister of the protagonist, Duncan Harris. In October 2020, she starred in the comedy thriller film The Wolf of Snow Hollow, directed by Jim Cummings, as Officer Julie Robson.

As of 2022, she stars as Dr. Valerie Kinbott, Wednesday Addams's therapist, in the Netflix comedy horror series Wednesday.

Music

Lindhome performs as "Garfunkel" in the comedy-folk duo Garfunkel and Oates, with her friend and fellow songwriter Kate Micucci.

Other work
, Lindhome will write the script for the upcoming animated musical film Steps, which she will executive produce and write the lyrics for alongside Micucci.

Public image
The Post-Standard included Lindhome on their list of the 101 most famous Syracuse University alumni.

Personal life
Lindhome has one son born in March 2022. She is unmarried.

Filmography

Film

Television

Web

Discography

 Yell at Me from Your Car EP (2011)

References

External links

Official website
 Channel on YouTube for Garfunkel and Oates

 

1979 births
21st-century American actresses
21st-century American comedians
Actresses from New York (state)
Actresses from Pennsylvania
American comedy musicians
American film actresses
American people of Swedish descent
American podcasters
American television actresses
American women comedians
American women podcasters
Comedians from New York (state)
Living people
Musicians from New York (state)
Musicians from Pennsylvania
People from Cattaraugus County, New York
People from Potter County, Pennsylvania
Syracuse University alumni